Caulerpa filiformis is a species of seaweed in the Caulerpaceae family. It has been recorded at coastal sites in Australia and South Africa.

References

filiformis
Species described in 1841